Then Came You, also known as Departures, is a 2018 American romantic comedy-drama film directed by Peter Hutchings and written by Fergal Rock. It stars Asa Butterfield, Maisie Williams, Nina Dobrev, Tyler Hoechlin, David Koechner, Ken Jeong and Peyton List.

The film premiered at the 2018 Woodstock Film Festival and was released on February 1, 2019, to generally average reviews.

Plot
Skye Aitken is a adolescent girl who is told she has reached the final stages of her cancer and has little time left. Calvin Lewis is a young man working as a baggage handler at the airport along with his father and elder brother Frank. At work, Calvin has a crush on Izzy, a flight attendant, but has difficulty talking to her. Calvin struggles to interact with others since he has a constant fear that he is dying. His doctor thinks he's a hypochondriac, though Calvin denies it, and advises him to go to a support group for those with cancer to gain a different perspective.

At the meeting, Calvin encounters Skye, who immediately shows an interest in him. Although he tries to explain to Skye that he doesn't have cancer, they quickly become friends and Calvin offers to help Skye finish her list of things to do before she dies. Initially annoyed with her blunt, unpredictable behavior, Calvin eventually confesses that he enjoys being her friend and misses her when she's not around. Skye goes to a high school party with Calvin, where she sees one of her friends make out with Will, a guy whom she has a crush on. As Calvin and Skye begin to spend more time together, Calvin slowly overcomes his fear of dying.

Skye manages to set up a date for Calvin with Izzy, during which she falsely informs Izzy that Calvin also has cancer. Izzy then begins to show more interest in Calvin, and the two begin dating. Skye reveals to Calvin that she has always been aware that Calvin does not have cancer, even so, Calvin hesitates to tell Izzy the truth as he is worried that she only likes him because she thinks he has cancer. Skye learns from Lucy, Calvin's sister-in-law, that his mother "shut down" after the death of his twin sister in a car accident when they were 8 years old while their mother was driving. Calvin finally admits to Izzy on a date that he doesn't have cancer, but she breaks up with him because she is hurt that he lied to her. Skye decides to lose her virginity to Will.

Calvin becomes depressed after his breakup with Izzy and stops going to work, but his father convinces him to go back to work. Meanwhile Skye admits to Calvin that she was disappointed after losing her virginity to Will because it happened so quickly. After Skye passes out in public and is sent to the hospital, Lucy simultaneously goes into labor, allowing Calvin and Skye to be  able to meet his new niece. Frank and Lucy announce that they want Skye and Calvin to be the baby's godparents, even as Skye points out that she does not have long to live. Calvin begins to have a panic attack but Frank helps him calm down and reminds him that Skye still needs him to be there for her.

Calvin makes efforts to help Skye finish the rest of things to do on her lists with a little help from Izzy and Skye's parents. Calvin reveals to Skye that he stopped celebrating birthdays for the sake of his mother after his twin sister's death. After Skye passes away, Calvin receives birthday cards in the mail from her to make up for the ones he didn’t celebrate. He finally finds the courage to face his fear of heights and decides to take a trip on a plane. During take-off, Izzy and Calvin continuously make eye-contact with each other, implying that they may be planning to reconcile their relationship.

Cast
Asa Butterfield as Calvin Lewis, Frank's brother, Bob's son and a young man who has a fear of dying and quickly befriends Skye
Maisie Williams as Skye Elizabeth Aitken, Claire's daughter and a teenage girl with terminal cancer who quickly befriends Calvin
Nina Dobrev as Izzy, a flight attendant whom Calvin has a crush on
Tyler Hoechlin as Frank Lewis, Calvin's elder brother, Lucy's husband and Bob's son
David Koechner as Bob Lewis, Frank and Calvin's father
Peyton List as Ashley, Skye's former best friend
Tituss Burgess as Julian, friend and boss to Izzy at the airport 
Sonya Walger as Claire, Skye's mother 
Margot Bingham as Lucy Lewis, Calvin's sister-in-law and Frank's wife
Ken Jeong as Officer Al, a police officer who befriends Calvin after assuming he has cancer
Briana Venskus as Officer Mya, partner to Officer Al who befriends Calvin and Skye
Angel Valle Jr. as Will, a high school boy whom Skye has a crush on
Rabbi Joseph Kolakowski (uncredited) as Rabbi (extra)
Obada Adnan (uncredited)

Production

In May 2017, some scenes were shot at Albany International Airport.

Release
The film had its world premiere at the 2018 Woodstock Film Festival on October 12, 2018. It was released in theaters and on VOD by Shout! Factory on February 1, 2019.

Reception

Box office
Then Came You grossed $668,488 worldwide.

Critical response
On Metacritic, the film has a weighted average score of 44 out of 100, based on 7 critics, indicating "mixed or average reviews". Nell Minow of RogerEbert.com gave the film one star. Sandie Angulo Chen of Common Sense Media gave it three stars out of five.

References

External links
 
 
 

2018 films
2018 independent films
2018 romantic comedy-drama films
American adventure films
American coming-of-age comedy-drama films
American independent films
American romantic comedy-drama films
American teen romance films
Coming-of-age romance films
Films about cancer
2010s English-language films
Films directed by Peter Hutchings
2010s American films